How to Fix Radios is a Canadian drama film, directed by Emily Russell and Casper Leonard and released in 2021. The film centres on the friendship between Evan (James Rudden), a shy and isolated teenager in small town Ontario whose worldview is challenged when he takes a summer job at a bait shop where his supervisor is the more assertive and openly gay Ross (Dimitri Watson).

The film premiered on March 5, 2021, at the Kingston Canadian Film Festival, and was subsequently screened in May at the Inside Out Film and Video Festival.

References

External links

2021 films
2021 drama films
2021 LGBT-related films
Canadian coming-of-age drama films
Canadian LGBT-related films
English-language Canadian films
Films shot in Ontario
Films set in Ontario
LGBT-related coming-of-age films
LGBT-related drama films
Gay-related films
2020s English-language films
2020s Canadian films